Marina Karystinou (born 5 January 1976) is a Greek swimmer. She competed in three events at the 1996 Summer Olympics.

References

1976 births
Living people
Greek female swimmers
Olympic swimmers of Greece
Swimmers at the 1996 Summer Olympics
Place of birth missing (living people)